Otto Georg Dersch (born March 17, 1848 in Ortenberg, Hesse) was a German mathematician who worked in algebraic geometry. Dersch got his Ph.D. 1873 in Gießen. He was teacher in  Groß-Umstadt and Darmstadt and then director of a secondary school in Offenbach am Main, and then became director of a secondary school (Oberrealschule) in Darmstadt until at least 1915.

Publications

References

1848 births
19th-century German mathematicians
Algebraic geometers
Year of death missing